Euphyllia glabrescens is a species of large-polyped stony coral belonging to the family Caryophylliidae. Its common name is the torch coral due to its long sweeper tentacles tipped with potent cnidocytes. It is a commonly kept species in the marine aquarium hobby, particularly specimens from Indonesia and Fiji, who fulfilled annual export quotas of 28,000 and 6,000 pieces, respectively, in 2005.

Description
Euphyllia glabrescens is a colonial coral with a phaceloid formation of corallites 20-30 millimeters (0.8 - 1.2 inches) in diameter and spaced 15-30 millimeters (0.6 - 1.2 inches) apart. Walls are thin, with sharp edges.  Polyps have large tubular tentacles with knob-like tips. It can be a number of colors, and is often bicolored with contrasting tentacles and polyp tips.

Distribution & habitat
This is a widely distributed species, rare to the Red Sea and the Gulf of Aden, while uncommon through the northern Indian Ocean, the Persian Gulf, the central Indo-Pacific, Australia, Southeast Asia, southern Japan and the East China Sea, Micronesia, and American Samoa.

Euphyllia glabrescens can be founds in depths of 1 to 35 meters (3 – 115 feet) in a wide range of reef environments

References 

Euphylliidae
Animals described in 1821